Nicolas Benezet (born 24 February 1991) is a French professional footballer who plays as an attacking midfielder for  club Nîmes.

Club career

France
Born in Montpellier, Benezet played in the youth academy of Montpellier before signing with Nîmes in 2004. He made his professional debut in the 2010–11 season on 15 October 2010 in a league match against Istres appearing as a substitute in a 0–0 draw. On 8 December 2010, he signed his first professional contract after agreeing to a three-year deal with Nîmes. Two days later, he rewarded Nîmes by scoring his first professional goal in a 3–2 victory over Istres in the Coupe de France. On 21 December, he scored his first professional league goal in a 2–0 win against Metz.

At the end of the 2012–13 season, top-flight clubs Sochaux-Montbéliard and Evian Thonon Gaillard showed interest in signing him and in July 2013, Benezet joined Evian.

On 3 July 2015, Benezet signed for En Avant de Guingamp.

Major League Soccer
In July 2019, following Guingamp's relegation from Ligue 1, Benezet joined Major League Soccer club Toronto FC on loan for the remainder of their season, with the club holding an option to make the transfer permanent at the conclusion of the loan, which would be triggered automatically if he started six regular season matches (he ultimately started five). Toronto chose not to acquire him permanently after the loan due to a lack of salary cap space after the re-signing of Michael Bradley.

In January, Benezet returned to MLS, signing with Colorado Rapids, who paid a $500,000 transfer fee to Guingamp for him, after acquiring his MLS rights from Toronto in a trade. He made his Rapids debut on 12 July against Real Salt Lake at the MLS is Back Tournament. he earned his first assist in Burgundy on Kellyn Acosta's opening goal against Sporting Kansas City on 17 July. Benezet finished the season with three assists among 13 appearances, including Colorado's first-round playoff loss at Minnesota United FC.

On August 5, 2021, Benezet was traded to Seattle Sounders FC for $50,000 in general allocation money. He was signed through the end of the 2021 season, with an option for the 2022 season, primarily to provide depth for the team. Benezet made his Sounders debut on August 15 in a 6–2 victory against the Portland Timbers, entering the match as a substitute and scoring in stoppage time. Following the 2021 season, Seattle declined their contract option on Benezet.

Return to France
In June 2022, Benezet returned to Nîmes and signed a one-year contract with the option to extend for three more seasons.

Personal life
Benezet is a noted fan of anime and manga, particularly Dragon Ball Z and One Piece.

Career statistics

Club

Notes

References

External links
 
 

Living people
1991 births
Association football midfielders
French footballers
France youth international footballers
Nîmes Olympique players
Thonon Evian Grand Genève F.C. players
En Avant Guingamp players
Stade Malherbe Caen players
Toronto FC players
Colorado Rapids players
Seattle Sounders FC players
Championnat National players
Ligue 1 players
Ligue 2 players
Major League Soccer players
French expatriate footballers
French expatriate sportspeople in the United States
Expatriate soccer players in the United States